The 1952 Swedish speedway season was the 1952 season of motorcycle speedway in Sweden.

Individual

Individual Championship
The 1952 Swedish Individual Speedway Championship final was held on 24 October in Stockholm. Göte Olsson won the Swedish Championship.

Team

Team Championship
Getingarna won division 1 and were declared the winners of the Swedish Speedway Team Championship.

Monarkerna won division 2.

There were three name changes for the 1952 season; they were Falkarna who became Knallarna, Hyllingarna who became Stenbockarna and Solkatterna became Kavaljererna.

See also 
 Speedway in Sweden

References

Speedway leagues
Professional sports leagues in Sweden
Swedish
Seasons in Swedish speedway